Have You Seen? is the second studio album by American rapper Rampage. It was released on June 6, 2006 via Sure Shot Recordings. Audio production of the twenty-seven-track record was handled by Felony Muzik, Prayon, Mac G, The Boogiii Men, DJ Scratch, The Neptunes, Turay, Yountie Strickland, and DJ Blaze. Sean Paul, Lady Day, City Boyz, DJ Kool, Hollywood Dave made guest appearances on the album, as well as Rampage's Flipmode Squad bandmate Busta Rhymes.

Track listing

Personnel

Roger "Rampage" McNair - main artist, executive producer
Dereck Z. McKinnis - guest artist (tracks: 8, 10), producer (tracks: 1, 6, 10, 12-13, 15, 18, 20, 23, 27), co-producer (track 21), executive producer, mixing & recording (tracks: 1-2, 4, 6-8, 10-15, 18-21, 23, 25, 27)
D. "Lady Day" Pringle - guest artist (tracks: 2, 6, 17)
Trevor George Smith Jr. - guest artist (tracks: 3-4)
Sean Paul Ryan Francis Henriques - guest artist (track 7)
John W. Bowman Jr. - guest artist (track 15)
"Hollywood Dave" Kirkland - guest artist (track 22)
Eran Prion - producer (tracks: 2, 7, 21)
Jermaine Russ - producer (tracks: 14, 19, 25)
George Spivey - producer (track 4)
Chad Hugo - producer (track 16)
Pharrell Williams - producer (track 16)
Yountie Strickland - producer (track 22)
D. "Turay" Wesley - producer (track 24)
Alexa Motley - executive producer, management
Isaac "Ike" Hamm III - management

References

2006 albums
Rampage (rapper) albums
Albums produced by DJ Scratch
Albums produced by the Neptunes
Conglomerate (record label) albums